Zhang Xiaofei (born 11 July 1982 in Shenyang) is a professional Chinese footballer.

Club career 
Zhang Xiaofei started his senior career with Changchun Yatai, where he made his debut in 2002. The following season he became a regular for the team and by the 2005 season he was an integral part of the Changchun Yatai that were promoted into Chinese Super League. The 2007 season was to prove highly successful for Zhang Xiaofei as he played a vital part in the title winning Changchun Yatai team.

International career 
Zhang Xiaofei would make his debut for the Chinese national team on October 28, 2007 against Myanmar in a friendly match that ended in a 4-0 victory. Zhang Xiaofei was named in the squad for the 2010 FIFA World Cup qualification which China were unable to qualify in. He has subsequently played in several friendlies for the team.

Career statistics
Statistics accurate as of match played 11 November 2019.

Honours
Chinese Super League: 2007

References

External links 

 

1982 births
Living people
Footballers from Shenyang
Chinese footballers
China international footballers
Changchun Yatai F.C. players
China League One players
Chinese Super League players
Association football midfielders
Association football fullbacks